Stuart Steven Attwell (born 6 October 1982) is an English referee who referees in the Premier League.

Attwell made a prominent debut in 2008 as the youngest person ever to referee in the Premier League. but was demoted from the Select Group in February 2012, returning to refereeing in the Football League. He returned to the Select Group in March 2016.

Career

In 1982 he was born in Nuneaton, Warwickshire and grew up there. Attwell graduated from Staffordshire University in 2004. Refereeing had been a lifelong ambition for him, according to his father. Attwell worked his way up from local games to non-League football, then to the West Midlands League and the Football League.

His promotion to Football League refereeing came ahead of the 2007–08 season, officiating his first match on 11 August 2007 in a League Two fixture between Hereford United and Rotherham United. He first officiated in League One when taking charge of a game between Swansea City and Gillingham. Attwell continued to be promoted, and on 26 December 2007, he made his Championship debut officiating a 1–1 draw between Sheffield United and Blackpool. In total he refereed five Championship games during the 2007–08 season. On 26 May 2008 Attwell officiated the League Two play-off final between Rochdale and Stockport County at Wembley Stadium, won 3–2 by Stockport.

Attwell was included in the Select Group of referees for the 2008–09 season, making him eligible to referee in the Premier League, and granting him full-time employment by the Professional Game Match Officials Association. On 25 June 2008, he was promoted to the list of top flight officials in the Premier League, after just one season in the Football League. This made him the youngest ever Premier League referee at 25 years of age. On 23 August 2008, he made his Premier League debut when he refereed a 1–1 draw between Blackburn Rovers and Hull City.

Attwell and one of his assistants, Nigel Bannister, were censured for a decision to award a "ghost goal" to Reading in a Championship game at Watford on 20 September 2008 after Bannister mistakenly flagged for a goal instead of a corner kick. The incident led to both Attwell and Bannister being dropped from their duties the following weekend. Six weeks later, Attwell refereed a 1–1 draw between Derby County and Nottingham Forest.

On 20 December 2008, Attwell was added to the international list of referees for 2009.

In July 2010, Attwell officiated in Japanese J. League matches for three weeks. Attwell and Anthony Taylor were sent to Japan as part of referee exchange programmes signed between the English FA and Japanese FA.

In February 2012, Attwell was demoted from the list of Select Group Referees and returned to Football League duty on the National List. The move was said to come by mutual consent. Professional Game Match Officials Limited general manager Mike Riley backed Attwell to improve as a referee and return to the top level.

Attwell returned to officiating in the Premier League in October 2014. He was promoted to the list of Select Group Referees in March 2016.

Career statistics

England

Statistics for all competitions, including domestic, European and international. No records available prior to 2007–08.

Japan

References

External links 

Stuart Attwell Referee Statistics at soccerbase.com
Stuart Attwell Profile at Refworld.com
Stuart Attwell Profile at RateTheRef.net

1982 births
Living people
Sportspeople from Nuneaton
English football referees
English Football League referees
Premier League referees